Chor may refer to:

People with the name 
 Chor Chee Heung, Malaysian politician
 Chor Hooi Yee, Malaysian badminton player
 Chor Lau Heung, fictional character
 Chor Yeok Eng, Singaporean politician
 Chor Yuen, Chinese film director and actor

Other uses 
 Chor, Sindh, a town in Pakistan
 River Chor, a river in England
 CHOR, a Canadian radio station

See also 
 
 Choir
 Chore (disambiguation)
 Chors (disambiguation)
 Khor (disambiguation)